Odets is a surname. Notable people with the surname include:

Clifford Odets (1906–1963), American playwright, screenwriter, and director
Walt Odets (born 1947), American psychologist and author

See also
Odet (disambiguation)